GIPCL Vadodara Gas based Power Station is Gas turbine based combined cycle power plant. It is located at Dhanora village in Vadodara, Gujarat. The power plant is run by state-owned Gujarat Industrial Power Corporation Limited (GIPCL). The primary electricity generation is through the Gas turbines. Waste heat from the gas turbine is recovered by a heat recovery steam generator (HRSG) to power a conventional steam turbine. The HRSG recovers heat from a hot gas stream and produces steam, the steam utilized to power the steam turbines.

About GIPCL 
Gujarat Industrial Power Corporation Limited (GIPCL) is a Public Limited company incorporated in 1985. The company has been promoted by Gujarat's Public Sector Undertakings (PSUs), namely GSFC, GACL, Petrofils Co-operative Ltd. and GUVNL. In 1992 GIPCL commissioned its first power plant at Vadodara, It is a gas bases combined cycle power plant with 145 MW capacity. The concept of this power plant is group captive power plant, which supplies power to promoter companies, the power distribution to the promoters is in proportion to their original equity holding.

Capacity 
The installed capacity of the power plant is 310 MW.

See also 

 GIPCL Surat Thermal Power Station
NTPC Kawas Gas based power plant

References 

Natural gas-fired power stations in Gujarat
Vadodara district
1992 establishments in Gujarat
Energy infrastructure completed in 1992
Companies listed on the National Stock Exchange of India
Companies listed on the Bombay Stock Exchange
20th-century architecture in India